PJF may stand for:

Policía Judicial Federal, the former federal police force of Mexico
Pre-Joycean Fellowship
Philip José Farmer (1918–2009), American science fiction and fantasy author
Philip J. Fry, the protagonist in the animated television series Futurama
WPJF, AM radio station in Greenville, South Carolina